Mitini is a 2002 Nepali film directed by Anish Koirala.

Cast
 Bipana Thapa (Pooja)
 Dilip Rayamajhi
 Rekha Thapa (Jyoti)
Uttam Pradhan
Ram Chandra Adhikari
Shivahari Poudel
Pranay Raj Ghimire
Kusum Sitaula
Neeta Dhungana

See also

Cinema of Nepal
List of Nepalese films

References

External links
 
 Official Website

2002 films
2000s Nepali-language films
2002 drama films
Nepalese coming-of-age films

ne:झरना बज्राचार्य